San Bautista is a small city in the Canelones Department of southern Uruguay. 

San Bautista is also the name of the municipality to which the city belongs.

Geography

Location

History
According to the Act of Ley Nº 388, on 28 June 1854 it was holding the status of "Villa" (town). On 20 June 1901, it was given the status of "Pueblo" (village) by the Act of  Ley Nº 2.699. Its status was elevated to "Ciudad" (city) on 8 June 1993 by the Act of Ley Nº 16.380.

Population
In 2011 San Bautista had a population of 1,973. The Intendencia de Canelones has estimated a population of 4,045 for the municipality.

 
Source: Instituto Nacional de Estadística de Uruguay

Places of worship
 St. John the Baptist Parish Church (Roman Catholic)

References

External links
INE map of San Bautista

Populated places in the Canelones Department